The Łódź–Bednary railway is a railway line located in Łódź Voivodeship, Poland, connecting the city of Łódź with the village of Bednary, located on Warsaw-Kunowice railway. It is commonly described as Łódź-Łowicz railway, because the passenger traffic on the railway is guided toward the main station in the town of Łowicz. The section from Zgierz to Łódź is a crucial part of a railway ring around the city.

The railway line was opened in 1902 as the part of broad gauge Warsaw-Kalisz railway. During World War I it was rebuilt into standard gauge. Electrification of the line took place in 1965.

In the years 2007 the railway line was closed down due to poor condition of the tracks. Refurbishment took place between March and September 2011. Traffic was restored on 1 October 2011.

In the year 2013 the line received new stopping points, due to creation of Łódź Commuter Railway. Since 2015 ŁKA serves passenger traffic on the entire length of railway line. Previous operator, PolRegio, only serves a section between Zgierz and Łódź Kaliska stations.

On 30 November 2018 PKP PLK and ZRK DOM signed an agreement to refurbish the railway line on the section between Łódź Kaliska and Zgierz stations, in order to increase the operational speed of the section from 80 to 120 km/h

References 

Railway lines in Poland
Łódź Voivodeship
Transport in Łódź
Łowicz County
Zgierz County